Schickler is a surname. Notable people with the surname include:

David Schickler (born 1969), American writer and screenwriter
Eric Schickler (born 1969), American political scientist
Jonael Schickler (1976–2002), Swiss philosopher

See also
22546 Schickler, a main-belt asteroid